"Crush" is the fourth single from Australian drum and bass band Pendulum released from their third studio album, Immersion. Its release was set to coincide with the iTunes Immersion LP. The official video for the song was released on 7 January 2011 by BBC Radio 1 on their website. It was directed by Tim Qualtrough, who previously directed the official video for the single "Propane Nightmares". A "Crush" screensaver was released to promote the single. The song reached number 92 on the UK Singles Chart, staying on the chart for one week.

Track listing

Personnel
Pendulum
Rob Swire – writer, producer, vocals, synthesizers, mixing
Gareth McGrillen – production assistant, bass guitar
Peredur ap Gwynedd – guitar
KJ Sawka – acoustic drums

Other contributors
Brad Kohn – mixing acoustic drums

Charts

References

2011 singles
Songs written by Rob Swire
2010 songs
Pendulum (drum and bass band) songs